The Sola Busca tarot is the earliest completely extant example of a 78-card tarot deck. It is also the earliest tarot deck in which all the plain suit cards are illustrated and it is also the earliest tarot deck in which the trump card illustrations deviate from the classic tarot iconography. Unlike the earlier Visconti-Sforza tarot decks, the cards of the Sola Busca are numbered. The Trump cards have Roman numerals while the pips of the plain suits have Hindu Arabic numerals.The deck was created by an unknown artist and engraved onto metal in the late 15th century. A single complete hand-painted deck is known to exist, along with 35 uncolored cards held by various museums. The deck is notable not only for its age, but also for the quality of its artwork, which is characterized by expressive figures engraved with precise contours and shading. Various theories have been suggested about who created the deck, but its authorship remains uncertain.

Composition
The Sola-Busca deck comprises 78 cards including 21 trumps (trionfi) plus the Fool (Matte) and 56 suit cards. There had been many previous decks structured in this way. The names and illustrations on the trump cards in the Sola Busca are somewhat idiosyncratic for its time.The departure from classic trump iconography in the Sola Busca is a trait shared by later French suited tarot decks such as the Bourgeois Tarot and the Industrie und Glück Tarock decks.

The characters depicted in the Sola-Busca cards include Nebuchadnezzar and Gaius Marius, the uncle of Julius Caesar. Trump cards loosely follow the rise and fall of the Roman Empire but also include members of the Roman Pantheon such as Bacchus. All the characters can be easily linked to their equivalents in the earlier and later, more standard, decks.

Painted deck
The complete painted deck is currently housed at the Brera Museum in Milan. It can trace its provenance to the noble Busca-Serbelloni family. In the early 19th century the deck was owned by Marchioness Busca (born Duchess Serbelloni) of Milan. In 1907, the Busca-Serbelloni family donated black-and-white photographs of all 78 cards to the British Museum, where they were likely seen by A. E. Waite and Pamela Colman Smith, inspiring the subsequent Waite-Smith tarot deck. From 1948, the deck was owned by the Sola-Busca family, from which it received its name.

Unpainted cards
Thirty-five unpainted cards are also known. The Albertina museum in Vienna owns 23, including all of the trumps except the first and last, Mato and Nabuchodenasor. The 20 trump cards originally belonged to Count Moritz von Fries, while the other three came from the Imperial Court Library.

The British Museum owns four unpainted cards, which it purchased from William and George Smith in 1845. Four unpainted cards are also housed in Hamburg and Paris.

Impact
The similarities between the artwork of the Minor Arcana of the Waite-Smith deck and Sola-Busca's plain suits has led some scholars to suggest that artist Pamela Colman Smith drew inspiration from the earlier work. Smith created the art for her deck two years after the acquisition of photographs of the Sola-Busca deck by the British Museum, and likely saw the cards on display there. Notable similarities include the Three of Swords card and the Ten of Wands card in the Rider deck, which is very similar to the Ten of Swords card in the Sola-Busca deck.

Research
In 1938, Arthur Mayger Hind described the Sola Busca Tarot in his Early Italian Engravings and supposed that the deck was engraved around 1490 and then hand-painted in 1491, as a result of reading some of the inscriptions on the cards. He also supposed that the deck was created for a Venetian client by Mattia Serrati da Cosandola, a miniaturist operating in Ferrara (the center of Tarot card production at the time). In fact, many inscriptions on the cards refer without any doubt to the Republic of Venice. 

In 1987, in the catalogue of a great Tarot exhibition realized at the Estense Castle of Ferrara, Italian historian Giordano Berti wrote a summary of all the research made up to that point by various scholars. 

In 1995 the Italian scholar Sofia Di Vincenzo, in her book titled Antichi Tarocchi illuminati. L’alchimia nei Tarocchi Sola-Busca (Turin, 1995 and Stamford, 1998), argued that many images of the Sola Busca deck are related to themes of European alchemy as practised during the Renaissance.

In 1998, the german publisher Wolfgang Mayer printed, for the first time, a faithful version of the 78 cards in a limited edition of 700 numbered copies.

In 2012 the Pinacoteca di Brera organized the exhibition Il Segreto dei Segreti - I Tarocchi Sola Busca e la cultura ermetico-alchemica. In the catalog, the possible author of the engravings, Nicola di Maestro Antonio, the possible inspirer, the hermeticist Ludovico Lazzarelli, the year and place of execution of the color version, Venice in 1491, are suggested. Furthermore, it has been established in an irrefutable way that the Sola Busca Tarot is linked to the hermetic-alchemical tradition. The key figure is the King of Swords, titled Alecxandro M. (Alexander the Great), who according to a legend, reported in the medieval book entitled Secretum secretorum, was initiated into alchemy by his master, the philosopher Aristotle. In addition to Alexander the Great there are other characters linked to the hermetic-alchemical tradition. The Knight of Swords, Amone, refers to Zeus Ammon, the mythical putative father of Alexander who welcomed him in the Siwah Oasis. The Queen of Swords, Olympias, Alexander's mother, was known as a sorceress. The Knight of Cups, Natanabo, (Nectanebo), was an Egyptian priest and magician. Prof. Gnaccolini, inspired by the study of Sofia Di Vincenzo, cites many other explicit alchemical allegories.

Trump suit

Plain suits

Cups

Coins

Wands

Swords

References

External links

Tarot playing card decks